Northavon was a non-metropolitan district in Avon, England. It was abolished on 1 April 1996 and replaced by South Gloucestershire.

Political control
From the first election to the council in 1973 until its abolition in 1996, political control of the council was held by the following parties:

Council elections
1973 Northavon District Council election
1976 Northavon District Council election (New ward boundaries)
1979 Northavon District Council election
1983 Northavon District Council election
1987 Northavon District Council election
1991 Northavon District Council election (District boundary changes took place but the number of seats remained the same)

District result maps

By-election results

References

External links

 
Council elections in Avon
District council elections in England